Plasmodium carmelinoi is a parasite of the genus Plasmodium.

Like all Plasmodium species P. carmelinoi has both vertebrate and insect hosts. The vertebrate hosts for this parasite are reptiles.

Description
The parasite was first described by Lainson et al in 2010.

Geographical occurrence
This parasite is found in Brazil.

Vectors
Not known.

Clinical features and host pathology
P. carmelinoi infects the teiid lizard (Ameiva ameiva).

References

carmelinoi